Laureano Bisan-Etame Mayer (born 19 January 1977), commonly known as Lauren, is a Cameroonian former footballer who played as a right back. As an Arsenal player he won several trophies and is known as one of the 'Invincibles', a title given to the Arsenal squad in 2004 after they went undefeated in the 2003–04 season and won the Premier League title. He also won an Olympic Gold Medal at the 2000 Sydney Olympics and two Africa Cup of Nations titles in 2000 and 2002 with Cameroon. He holds dual Cameroonian-Spanish nationality due to being raised in Spain.

Club career

Early career
Lauren was born in Kribi, Cameroon, as his parents fled Equatorial Guinea due to the political persecution during the dictatorship of Francisco Macías Nguema. Then the family moved to Seville, Spain, where he was raised. He started his career in Spain playing for Utrera on loan from Sevilla, San Fernando, Sevilla, Levante, and Mallorca. He played the Cup Winners Cup with Mallorca against Lazio, and classified Mallorca to the Champions League. He received important offers (Real Madrid, Roma...), but he chose Arsenal.

Arsenal
After a transfer to Italian club Roma fell through, he moved to English club Arsenal in 2000. He made his Arsenal debut as a substitute against Sunderland on 19 August 2000 and scored his first goal for the club just two days later against Liverpool. However his first season was blighted by injuries. Although at first Lauren was unable to gain a regular place in the Arsenal side, he eventually ended up becoming the club's first-choice right back, replacing Lee Dixon and leapfrogging Oleh Luzhnyi in the process. By the time Arsenal had won the Double in 2001–02, Lauren was an integral part of the Arsenal defence. Lauren missed part of the season as he went off to play in the 2002 Africa Cup of Nations, but returned to feature for Arsenal from February onwards. He scored the winning goal, a penalty, against rivals Tottenham Hotspur as Arsenal closed in on the title.

In 2002–03, Lauren suffered a calf injury and again missed part of the season, but nevertheless recovered in time and won an FA Cup medal that season, as Arsenal beat Southampton 1–0.

Lauren was a consistent member of the Arsenal first team during 2003–04 and a became known as one of the 'Invincibles' after the club went the whole season unbeaten. Lauren made his 150th appearance for Arsenal during the record-breaking run and Arsenal won the Premier League title, giving Lauren his second League winners' medal. His season was, however, slightly marred by his verbal abuse towards Ruud van Nistelrooy after the latter had missed a penalty late on in a draw between Arsenal and Manchester United at Old Trafford. Lauren was banned by the Football Association for four matches and fined £40,000.

Lauren won a third FA Cup winners' medal in 2005, as Arsenal beat Manchester United on penalties after a 0–0 draw in the final; Lauren scored the first of Arsenal's spot-kicks. However, during 2005–06, Lauren suffered a knee injury against Wigan Athletic in a League Cup semi-final match on 24 January 2006. He spent nearly a year out of the game as a result, and it was not until 19 December that Lauren was included in a playing squad, for Arsenal's match against Liverpool in the League Cup quarter-finals; this match was later postponed due to heavy fog. Lauren was not called up for Arsenal again.

During his absence, Lauren's position had been covered by, amongst others, Emmanuel Eboué and Justin Hoyte, leading to media speculation that Lauren would leave Arsenal for West Ham United. On 12 January 2007, Wenger confirmed Arsenal would allow Lauren to leave, if he chose to do so. On 18 January 2007, Lauren joined Portsmouth on a -year contract for an undisclosed fee.

Portsmouth
On 18 January 2007, Lauren completed a transfer to Portsmouth on a -year contract. On 22 January, Harry Redknapp announced the transfer fee was £500,000.

Lauren made his debut on 20 January 2007 against Charlton Athletic and was a regular at right back for the remainder of the 2006–07 season. In the 2007–08 season, he dropped to second choice right back due to Glen Johnson's impressive form. However, Lauren found first team opportunities due to his versatility and filled in at left back on many occasions and played regularly on the right of midfield during January 2008 while John Utaka was away at the African Cup of Nations. Lauren was part of Portsmouth's 2007–08 FA Cup-winning team. Despite not making the squad for the final he appeared in the earlier rounds. In June 2009, his contract ended and he was released from the club having made just one appearance all season, as a substitute in the 2008 FA Community Shield.

Córdoba
On 15 March 2010, Córdoba announced that they had signed Lauren as a free agent. He made his league debut as a substitute for Arteaga on 3 April 2010 in a 0–0 away draw against Huesca. Lauren retired at the end of the season.

International career 
Lauren has said he feels Spanish, but chose to represent Cameroon, the nation of his birth. With Cameroon he won the 2000 Sydney Olympics and the Africa Cup of Nations title in 2000. 

This success was repeated when the team won the 2002 Africa Cup of Nations; Cameroon beat Senegal on penalties after a 0–0 draw. Lauren scored in the penalty shootout. 

Lauren made his international debut for Cameroon in 1998 and went on to earn a total of 25 caps, which yielded two goals, whilst he won Olympic Gold at the 2000 Games in Sydney and also lifted the Africa Cup of Nations in 2000 and 2002. He was part of the Indomitable Lions' squad at the France 1998 World Cup and the 2002 edition, held in Japan and Korea. Lauren announced his retirement from international football at the age of 25.

Arsenal legend 
Following the success he enjoyed at Arsenal, the north London outfit regard Lauren, who was a mainstay of the Invincibles side, as a club legend. He is a regular visitor to the Emirates Stadium and has lined up for the Arsenal Legends in charity matches organised by the club's foundation, such as the double-header against Real Madrid Legends played at the Emirates and the Santiago Bernabéu in the summer of 2018.

Arsenal ambassador 
Thanks to his career achievements at Arsenal and within the African game, which include two Africa Cup of Nations crowns and an Olympic Gold with Cameroon, Lauren currently serves as an Arsenal ambassador for the African continent, a role which features activities involving football and education, as well as attending gatherings with the club's supporters. Lauren considers this position to be a real honour as he sees it as a means of helping the African people, whilst repaying some of the support he received during his playing days. One of the countries Lauren has visited is Rwanda, where he took part in children's football and educational clinics, whilst he also acted as a club representative at official events with local authorities and explored the country's most iconic landmarks whilst flying the flag for Arsenal. 

Lauren's role as an Arsenal ambassador has also seen him travel to other global destinations, including Singapore, where he was again involved in football clinics and represented the club at various events.

FIFA technical expert 
Lauren was appointed as a FIFA technical expert for talent development. Within his role, he will be tasked with enhancing the competitive standards of African football on the international stage and is able to call on the vast experience acquired during a playing career that saw him earn legendary status with Arsenal and the Cameroon national team.

TV commentator 
Lauren is a well-respected voice of authority when it comes to match broadcasts. He regularly features on LaLiga TV's English-language Viva LaLiga show, which reviews all of the latest action from the Spanish top flight. Meanwhile, he has also worked as a studio pundit for GOL TV's coverage of major Arsenal matches, such as the 2018/19 Europa League final against Chelsea. He has also made media appearances for leading broadcasters, including Sky Sports, where he has featured on Guillem Balagué's Revista de La Liga show, and BBC Sport. He was part of ITV and Eurosport broadcasting teams for the 2012 and 2017 editions of the Africa Cup of Nations.

Personal life 
He is also an avid boxer and enjoys sparring in his spare time. He lives in Seville, and has two children.

Career statistics

Club

International

Scores and results list Cameroon's goal tally first, score column indicates score after each Lauren goal.

Honours
Mallorca
Supercopa de España: 1998

Arsenal
Premier League: 2001–02, 2003–04
FA Cup: 2001–02, 2002–03, 2004–05
FA Community Shield: 2002, 2004

Portsmouth
FA Cup: 2007–08

Cameroon
Olympic Tournament: 2000
African Cup of Nations: 2000, 2002

Individual
African Nations Cup Player of the Tournament: (2000)
PFA Team of the Year: 2003–04 Premier League

References

External links

Profile (Arsenal) at sporting-heroes.net
Profile (Cameroon) at sporting-heroes.net

 

1977 births
Living people
Cameroonian people of Equatoguinean descent
Sportspeople of Equatoguinean descent
Spanish sportspeople of Equatoguinean descent
Cameroonian footballers
Cameroon international footballers
1998 FIFA World Cup players
Olympic footballers of Cameroon
Olympic gold medalists for Cameroon
Footballers at the 2000 Summer Olympics
2001 FIFA Confederations Cup players
2002 FIFA World Cup players
2000 African Cup of Nations players
2002 African Cup of Nations players
Cameroonian expatriate footballers
Expatriate footballers in Spain
La Liga players
Sevilla Atlético players
Sevilla FC players
Levante UD footballers
RCD Mallorca players
Córdoba CF players
Expatriate footballers in England
Premier League players
Arsenal F.C. players
Portsmouth F.C. players
Association football fullbacks
Cameroonian expatriate sportspeople in Spain
Olympic medalists in football
People from South Region (Cameroon)
Medalists at the 2000 Summer Olympics
FA Cup Final players